Pula is a city in Istria, Croatia.

Pula may also refer to:

Places
 Pula, Banmauk, a village in Burma
 Pula, Tibet, a village in the Tibet Autonomous Region of China
 Pula, Hungary, a village in Veszprém county
 Pula, Sardinia, a comune in the Province of Cagliari

People
 Pula (surname), surname
 Pula (futsal), full name Vágner Kaetano Pereira, Russian futsal player
 PuLa, a short form of the name of Marathi theatre personality Purushottam Laxman Deshpānde

Other uses
 Botswana pula, the currency and the national motto of Botswana
 Pula (journal), a journal of African studies published in Botswana
 Pula River, a river of Ecuador
 Pula, a vulgar Romanian word for penis (see Romanian profanity)
 Pula, another name of the Filipino crab paste taba ng talangka

See also 
 Pula language (disambiguation)